Tambourissa pedicellata is a species of plant in the Monimiaceae family. It is endemic to Mauritius.  Its natural habitat is subtropical or tropical dry forests.

References

Monimiaceae
Endemic flora of Mauritius
Critically endangered plants
Taxonomy articles created by Polbot
Plants described in 1877